The Institute of Leadership & Management is a professional membership body for leaders and managers. Its stated mission is to inspire great leadership - everywhere.

The institute is a charity registered in England, Wales and Scotland, with its head office in Birmingham, UK,  and members in countries across the world.

Membership
Membership of The Institute of Leadership & Management is open to leaders and managers of all levels, including those with no practical experience. It is based in the UK, but open to membership worldwide. Organisations can sign up their employees as members.

Three grades of professional membership entitle the member to use post-nominal letters - Associate Member (AMInstLM), Member (MInstLM) and Fellow (FInstLM). Membership is validated by an official membership certificate and a digital credential.

Members are offered access a range of services to help with their Continuous professional development (CPD), although this isn't mandatory, including access to online learning tools, webinars and events, podcasts, career advice and tools.

Research
The Institute of Leadership & Management carries out extensive research into leadership and management in practice, providing insights for managers and leaders and publishing findings in research reports and journals. The Institute takes a collaborative approach, preferring to work with like-minded individuals and organisations in defining research topics and undertaking research activity.

Leadership Development
The Institute of Leadership & Management offers a wide range of learning resources to support the continuous professional development of leaders and managers in a variety of organisations and settings.

Publishing
EDGE Journal is the institute's quarterly in-house magazine, looking at the latest leadership and management issues. It is published by LID Publishing. The magazine is distributed to members as part of a range of benefits and learning resources.

History
The institute was formed in November 2001 through the merger of the Institute of Supervision and Management (ISM) and the National Examining Board for Supervision and Management (NEBS). 

The Institute of Supervision and Management (ISM) was founded in 1947 by J.K. Evans M.B.E.

The National Examinations Board in Supervisory Studies (NEBSS), subsequently the National Examining Board for Supervision and Management (NEBS), was established in June 1964, on the initiative of the Department of Education and Science, as an independent autonomous body administered by the City and Guilds of London Institute.

Following the merger, the Institute of Leadership & Management continued to be part of the City & Guilds Group until 2016, when the Institute of Leadership & Management demerged to become a separate organisation, with the accreditation body continuing as part of the City & Guilds Group, taking the name of ILM.

References

External links
 Official website

2001 establishments in the United Kingdom
Business and finance professional associations
Organisations based in Staffordshire
Organizations established in 1947
Leadership and Management
Tamworth, Staffordshire